The Braille pattern dots-1356 is a 6-dot braille cell with the top left, middle right, and both bottom dots raised, or an 8-dot braille cell with the top left, upper-middle right, and both lower-middle dots raised. It is represented by the Unicode code point U+2835, and in Braille ASCII with Z.

Unified Braille

In unified international braille, the braille pattern dots-1356 is used to represent a voiced alveolar sibilant, i.e. /z/, or otherwise as needed.

Table of unified braille values

Other braille

Plus dots 7 and 8

Related to Braille pattern dots-1356 are Braille patterns 13567, 13568, and 135678, which are used in 8-dot braille systems, such as Gardner-Salinas and Luxembourgish Braille.

Related 8-dot kantenji patterns

In the Japanese kantenji braille, the standard 8-dot Braille patterns 2678, 12678, 24678, and 124678 are the patterns related to Braille pattern dots-1356, since the two additional dots of kantenji patterns 01356, 13567, and 013567 are placed above the base 6-dot cell, instead of below, as in standard 8-dot braille.

Kantenji using braille patterns 2678, 12678, 24678, or 124678

This listing includes kantenji using Braille pattern dots-1356 for all 6349 kanji found in JIS C 6226-1978.

  - 石

Variants and thematic compounds

  -  selector 1 + ま/石  =  亟
  -  selector 4 + ま/石  =  了
  -  selector 5 + ま/石  =  曼
  -  selector 6 + ま/石  =  辟
  -  ま/石 + selector 1  =  立
  -  宿 + ま/石  =  寵
  -  数 + ま/石  =  万

Compounds of 石

  -  へ/⺩ + ま/石  =  碧
  -  お/頁 + ま/石  =  碩
  -  よ/广 + ま/石  =  磨
  -  ま/石 + や/疒  =  岩
  -  ま/石 + て/扌  =  拓
  -  ま/石 + そ/馬  =  砂
  -  ま/石 + ね/示  =  研
  -  ま/石 + お/頁  =  砕
  -  ま/石 + ま/石 + お/頁  =  碎
  -  ま/石 + 比  =  砦
  -  ま/石 + も/門  =  砲
  -  ま/石 + ひ/辶  =  破
  -  ま/石 + こ/子  =  砿
  -  ま/石 + ⺼  =  硝
  -  ま/石 + く/艹  =  硫
  -  ま/石 + な/亻  =  硬
  -  ま/石 + よ/广  =  碍
  -  ま/石 + た/⽥  =  碑
  -  ま/石 + い/糹/#2  =  確
  -  ま/石 + ゐ/幺  =  磁
  -  ま/石 + 囗  =  磯
  -  ま/石 + 火  =  礁
  -  ま/石 + き/木  =  礎
  -  ま/石 + ま/石 + ま/石  =  磊
  -  ふ/女 + 宿 + ま/石  =  妬
  -  う/宀/#3 + 宿 + ま/石  =  宕
  -  ま/石 + 宿 + を/貝  =  斫
  -  心 + う/宀/#3 + ま/石  =  柘
  -  ま/石 + こ/子 + selector 1  =  矼
  -  ま/石 + れ/口 + ぬ/力  =  砌
  -  ま/石 + 宿 + 比  =  砒
  -  ま/石 + selector 5 + そ/馬  =  砠
  -  ま/石 + selector 1 + ん/止  =  砥
  -  ま/石 + れ/口 + と/戸  =  砧
  -  ま/石 + 宿 + つ/土  =  硅
  -  ま/石 + め/目 + 宿  =  硯
  -  ま/石 + た/⽥ + selector 1  =  硲
  -  ま/石 + く/艹 + 比  =  硴
  -  ま/石 + ら/月 + ら/月  =  硼
  -  き/木 + 宿 + ま/石  =  碁
  -  ま/石 + に/氵 + ひ/辶  =  碆
  -  ま/石 + う/宀/#3 + よ/广  =  碇
  -  ま/石 + 宿 + み/耳  =  碌
  -  ま/石 + 宿 + い/糹/#2  =  碓
  -  ま/石 + 宿 + け/犬  =  碕
  -  ま/石 + 宿 + う/宀/#3  =  碗
  -  ま/石 + 宿 + ま/石  =  碚
  -  ま/石 + 宿 + ま/石  =  碚
  -  ま/石 + 宿 + 氷/氵  =  碣
  -  ま/石 + selector 1 + き/木  =  碪
  -  ま/石 + 宿 + ち/竹  =  碯
  -  ま/石 + を/貝 + と/戸  =  碵
  -  ま/石 + 龸 + そ/馬  =  碼
  -  ま/石 + と/戸 + と/戸  =  碾
  -  ま/石 + 宿 + ほ/方  =  磅
  -  ま/石 + か/金 + ら/月  =  磆
  -  ま/石 + そ/馬 + こ/子  =  磋
  -  ま/石 + 宿 + の/禾  =  磐
  -  ま/石 + selector 5 + や/疒  =  磑
  -  ま/石 + 宿 + き/木  =  磔
  -  ま/石 + selector 4 + て/扌  =  磚
  -  ま/石 + へ/⺩ + を/貝  =  磧
  -  ま/石 + み/耳 + の/禾  =  磬
  -  ま/石 + す/発 + と/戸  =  磴
  -  ま/石 + 龸 + つ/土  =  磽
  -  ま/石 + 囗 + の/禾  =  礇
  -  ま/石 + 龸 + ふ/女  =  礑
  -  ま/石 + そ/馬 + 囗  =  礒
  -  ま/石 + や/疒 + よ/广  =  礙
  -  ま/石 + よ/广 + こ/子  =  礦
  -  ま/石 + 龸 + ま/石  =  礪
  -  ま/石 + 日 + ゐ/幺  =  礫
  -  ま/石 + き/木 + き/木  =  礬
  -  む/車 + 宿 + ま/石  =  蠧
  -  む/車 + 龸 + ま/石  =  蠹
  -  み/耳 + 宿 + ま/石  =  跖
  -  か/金 + 龸 + ま/石  =  鉐
  -  せ/食 + う/宀/#3 + ま/石  =  鮖

Compounds of 亟

  -  き/木 + ま/石  =  極
  -  囗 + ま/石  =  函
  -  囗 + 囗 + ま/石  =  凾
  -  に/氵 + 囗 + ま/石  =  涵

Compounds of 了

  -  龸 + ま/石  =  亨
  -  火 + 龸 + ま/石  =  烹
  -  ま/石 + 氷/氵  =  承

Compounds of 曼

  -  し/巿 + ま/石  =  幔
  -  る/忄 + ま/石  =  慢
  -  氷/氵 + ま/石  =  漫
  -  い/糹/#2 + 宿 + ま/石  =  縵
  -  く/艹 + 宿 + ま/石  =  蔓
  -  く/艹 + 龸 + ま/石  =  蘰
  -  え/訁 + 龸 + ま/石  =  謾
  -  か/金 + 宿 + ま/石  =  鏝
  -  せ/食 + 龸 + ま/石  =  饅
  -  と/戸 + う/宀/#3 + ま/石  =  鬘
  -  せ/食 + 宿 + ま/石  =  鰻

Compounds of 辟

  -  や/疒 + ま/石  =  癖
  -  ⺼ + ま/石  =  臂
  -  ひ/辶 + ま/石  =  避
  -  ま/石 + つ/土  =  壁
  -  ま/石 + へ/⺩  =  璧
  -  ふ/女 + selector 6 + ま/石  =  嬖
  -  く/艹 + selector 6 + ま/石  =  薜
  -  心 + selector 6 + ま/石  =  蘗
  -  み/耳 + selector 6 + ま/石  =  躄
  -  き/木 + ま/石 + selector 1  =  蘖
  -  な/亻 + 宿 + ま/石  =  僻
  -  ぬ/力 + 宿 + ま/石  =  劈
  -  て/扌 + 宿 + ま/石  =  擘
  -  心 + 龸 + ま/石  =  檗
  -  ま/石 + selector 6 + か/金  =  甓
  -  心 + ろ/十 + ま/石  =  薛
  -  ね/示 + 宿 + ま/石  =  襞
  -  え/訁 + 宿 + ま/石  =  譬
  -  も/門 + 宿 + ま/石  =  闢
  -  ち/竹 + 宿 + ま/石  =  霹

Compounds of 立

  -  ま/石 + ま/石  =  並
  -  ま/石 + ふ/女  =  普
  -  き/木 + ま/石 + ま/石  =  椪
  -  な/亻 + ま/石  =  位
  -  く/艹 + な/亻 + ま/石  =  莅
  -  仁/亻 + ま/石  =  倍
  -  つ/土 + ま/石  =  培
  -  火 + ま/石  =  焙
  -  を/貝 + ま/石  =  賠
  -  さ/阝 + ま/石  =  陪
  -  ま/石 + ぬ/力  =  剖
  -  ま/石 + ぬ/力 + 囗  =  韶
  -  ま/石 + さ/阝  =  部
  -  く/艹 + ま/石 + さ/阝  =  蔀
  -  日 + ま/石  =  暗
  -  ゑ/訁 + ま/石  =  諳
  -  も/門 + ま/石  =  闇
  -  ゐ/幺 + ま/石  =  響
  -  に/氵 + ま/石  =  泣
  -  め/目 + ま/石  =  瞳
  -  ち/竹 + ま/石  =  笠
  -  の/禾 + ま/石  =  粒
  -  む/車 + ま/石  =  翌
  -  ま/石 + え/訁  =  商
  -  ま/石 + し/巿  =  帝
  -  い/糹/#2 + ま/石  =  締
  -  え/訁 + ま/石  =  諦
  -  み/耳 + ま/石  =  蹄
  -  囗 + ま/石 + し/巿  =  啻
  -  れ/口 + ま/石 + し/巿  =  啼
  -  心 + ま/石 + し/巿  =  楴
  -  く/艹 + ま/石 + し/巿  =  蒂
  -  ま/石 + う/宀/#3  =  彰
  -  ふ/女 + ま/石  =  妾
  -  て/扌 + ま/石  =  接
  -  き/木 + ふ/女 + ま/石  =  椄
  -  ち/竹 + ふ/女 + ま/石  =  霎
  -  ま/石 + 心  =  竜
  -  ま/石 + ち/竹  =  篭
  -  ま/石 + ま/石 + 心  =  龍
  -  つ/土 + ま/石 + 心  =  壟
  -  へ/⺩ + ま/石 + 心  =  瓏
  -  ち/竹 + ま/石 + 心  =  籠
  -  心 + ま/石 + 心  =  蘢
  -  さ/阝 + ま/石 + 心  =  隴
  -  き/木 + ま/石 + 心  =  槞
  -  ま/石 + ろ/十  =  章
  -  心 + ま/石 + ろ/十  =  樟
  -  へ/⺩ + ま/石 + ろ/十  =  璋
  -  や/疒 + ま/石 + ろ/十  =  瘴
  -  せ/食 + ま/石 + ろ/十  =  鱆
  -  ま/石 + り/分  =  童
  -  な/亻 + ま/石 + り/分  =  僮
  -  に/氵 + ま/石 + り/分  =  潼
  -  し/巿 + ま/石 + り/分  =  幢
  -  て/扌 + ま/石 + り/分  =  撞
  -  き/木 + ま/石 + り/分  =  橦
  -  ふ/女 + ま/石 + り/分  =  艟
  -  ま/石 + の/禾  =  端
  -  ま/石 + 宿  =  競
  -  ま/石 + ま/石 + 宿  =  竸
  -  ま/石 + せ/食  =  靖
  -  ま/石 + 日  =  音
  -  ま/石 + れ/口  =  韻
  -  ろ/十 + ま/石  =  辛
  -  ま/石 + を/貝  =  新
  -  れ/口 + ま/石  =  噺
  -  く/艹 + ま/石  =  薪
  -  う/宀/#3 + ま/石  =  宰
  -  せ/食 + ま/石  =  辞
  -  ま/石 + め/目  =  親
  -  ま/石 + 数  =  辣
  -  て/扌 + ま/石 + selector 1  =  拉
  -  ま/石 + ま/石 + selector 1  =  竝
  -  す/発 + ま/石 + selector 1  =  竪
  -  心 + ま/石 + selector 1  =  苙
  -  ね/示 + ま/石 + め/目  =  襯
  -  し/巿 + ま/石 + 日  =  黯
  -  や/疒 + う/宀/#3 + ま/石  =  嶂
  -  き/木 + 龸 + ま/石  =  柆
  -  ほ/方 + 宿 + ま/石  =  殕
  -  ま/石 + 宿 + そ/馬  =  毅
  -  に/氵 + う/宀/#3 + ま/石  =  滓
  -  い/糹/#2 + う/宀/#3 + ま/石  =  縡
  -  ま/石 + 宿 + ろ/十  =  竍
  -  ま/石 + 数 + せ/食  =  竏
  -  ま/石 + 宿 + せ/食  =  竓
  -  ま/石 + 宿 + り/分  =  竕
  -  ま/石 + 宿 + と/戸  =  站
  -  ま/石 + 数 + て/扌  =  竚
  -  ま/石 + 数 + め/目  =  竡
  -  ま/石 + selector 6 + む/車  =  竢
  -  ま/石 + 宿 + む/車  =  竣
  -  ま/石 + き/木 + 数  =  竦
  -  ま/石 + 龸 + 氷/氵  =  竭
  -  ま/石 + よ/广 + り/分  =  竰
  -  ま/石 + む/車 + selector 2  =  翊
  -  心 + 宿 + ま/石  =  菩
  -  せ/食 + せ/食 + ま/石  =  辭
  -  ま/石 + 宿 + も/門  =  韵
  -  ま/石 + む/車 + 宿  =  颯
  -  ま/石 + 宿 + 火  =  靡
  -  ま/石 + selector 4 + せ/食  =  麾
  -  ま/石 + り/分 + 囗  =  龕

Compounds of 寵

  -  ら/月 + ま/石  =  朧

Compounds of 万

  -  ぬ/力 + ま/石  =  励
  -  数 + 数 + ま/石  =  萬
  -  や/疒 + 数 + ま/石  =  癘
  -  の/禾 + 数 + ま/石  =  糲
  -  心 + 数 + ま/石  =  栃
  -  ま/石 + 数 + ま/石  =  砺
  -  む/車 + 数 + ま/石  =  蛎

Other compounds

  -  は/辶 + ま/石  =  邁
  -  ぬ/力 + ぬ/力 + ま/石  =  勵
  -  か/金 + ま/石  =  鎌
  -  心 + ま/石  =  麻
  -  ま/石 + み/耳  =  麿
  -  れ/口 + 心 + ま/石  =  嘛
  -  や/疒 + 心 + ま/石  =  痲
  -  の/禾 + 心 + ま/石  =  糜
  -  い/糹/#2 + 心 + ま/石  =  縻
  -  ゐ/幺 + 心 + ま/石  =  麼
  -  め/目 + 宿 + ま/石  =  睫

Notes

Braille patterns